USL League Two (USL2), formerly the Premier Development League (PDL), is a semi-professional developmental soccer league sponsored by United Soccer Leagues in the United States and Canada, forming part of the United States soccer league system. The league features 122 teams for 2023, split into sixteen regional divisions across four conferences. USL League Two is headquartered in Tampa, Florida.

Ventura County Fusion are the current champions, having defeated Long Island Rough Riders 2–1 in the 2022 USL League Two Championship game on August 6, 2022.

Competition format
USL League Two is divided into 4 conferences (Eastern, Central, Southern, and Western), comprising 16 divisions. The league season runs from May through July, with the playoffs decided through July and August. All teams play a regular season schedule of 14 games, seven home and seven away, within their division.

Playoffs
The USL2 playoffs see division winners and each conference's best second-place finisher advance to the conference semifinals. All matches in the playoffs are played in single match elimination format, with each conference winner hosting a four-team conference championship weekend. The four conference champions advance to national semifinals and the league Championship, both played at the home of the higher seed.

History

1990s
In 1995 the United States Interregional Soccer League (USISL) changed its name to the United States International Soccer League, and split into two leagues, one professional (the 'Professional League', which ultimately became the USL Second Division) and one amateur (the Premier League). The purpose for the split was to expand into and improve the soccer capabilities of many urban areas throughout the United States and Canada, while offering current college soccer players the opportunity to continue playing during the summer months without losing their college eligibility. The inaugural season of the new USISL Premier League featured 27 teams, and the Richmond Kickers won the first title, beating the Cocoa Expos 3–1 in the championship game. Gabe Jones of the Austin Lone Stars was the league's top scorer and MVP.

The United States International Soccer League changed its name again in 1996, to the United Systems of Independent Soccer Leagues, and before the season, there was substantial movement of teams between the Pro League, the Premier League and the newly created Select League (which would later merge with the A-League, and eventually become the USL First Division). The Premier League grew to 34 teams in its second year, with the Central Coast Roadrunners from San Luis Obispo, California beating the San Francisco Bay Seals in the championship game to take the title. Pasi Kinturi of the Nashville Metros was the league's top scorer and MVP.

The Premier League renamed itself the Premier Development Soccer League (PDSL) in 1997, and the Central Coast Roadrunners repeated as national champions, the first team to do so, beating the Cocoa Expos in the PDSL championship game. Lester Felicia of the Jackson Chargers was the league's MVP, while Rodrigo Costa of the Detroit Dynamite was the leading scorer and the league's Rookie of the Year, tallying 21 goals and 2 assists for 44 points. In 1998 the PDSL took to the field with 33 teams, including four associate members from the Pacific Coast Soccer League who played shortened schedules after their PCSL season was over. In the championship game the San Gabriel Valley Highlanders upset regular season champions Jackson Chargers 3–2, taking the trophy to California for the third straight year. Rodrigo Costa of the Detroit Dynamite was the league MVP, Boniventure Manati of the Jackson Chargers was the league's top scorer, and a young striker by the name of Brian Ching from the Spokane Shadow was named Rookie of the Year.

In 1999 the umbrella USISL changed its name to the United Soccer Leagues, and the Premier Development Soccer League dropped the 'soccer' part of its name and became known as the USL Premier Development League, or PDL. The league took in several teams from the D3 Pro league, expanding to 42 teams in six divisions. Expansion franchise Chicago Sockers ultimately won the league, beating Spokane Shadow 3–1 for the title in a tight championship game. Fabio Eidenwein of the Sioux City Breeze was named League MVP and was the top scorer, with 20 goals.

2000s

The PDL expanded by a further eight franchises in 2000, and the Chicago Sockers won their second straight title, beating the Mid-Michigan Bucks in a close 1–0 championship game. The single goal was scored by Rodrigo Costa who, having received a pass from teammate Hamid Mehreioskouei, chipped Bucks goalkeeper Eric Pogue from 18 yards through a crowded penalty area. Fernando Salazar of the Los Angeles-based San Fernando Valley Heroes was the league's MVP, while his teammate Arshak Abyanli took the honors as top goalscorer.

The league grew from 41 to 44 teams in 2001 through the usual mix of relegation from D3Pro, teams folding and new franchises being added. In the semi-finals, the Westchester Flames defeated Sioux Falls Spitfire 5–1 and Calgary Storm defeated Des Moines Menace 2–1; in the final, Westchester defeated Calgary 3–1 to take their first league title. Des Moines and Chicago Fire Reserves dominated the 2002 regular season, but both teams stuttered in the playoffs; the PDL final saw the Cape Cod Crusaders defeating the Boulder Rapids Reserve 2–1 to bring the title to the Northeast for the second year in a row. 2002 also saw the debut of the soon-to-be PDL legend, Tomas Boltnar of Des Moines Menace, who secured an unprecedented triple-crown of PDL MVP, Top Scorer and Rookie of the Year.

The mid-2000s was a period of steady growth and consolidation for the PDL. A TV agreement with Fox Soccer Channel saw the PDL Championship game being broadcast live on national television in North America for the first time, and professional teams began investing in the league by adding U-23 development sides as an addition to their senior rosters. Cape Cod repeated as PDL champs in 2003, beating the Chicago Fire Reserves in the final (and despite the presence of Jürgen Klinsmann playing for Orange County Blue Star), while 2004 saw the title head to Florida for the first time as the Central Florida Kraze overcame perennial bridesmaids Boulder Rapids Reserve.

Des Moines Menace took the PDL Championship trophy back to Iowa in 2005 after beating the El Paso Patriots 6–5 on penalty kicks, following a 0–0 draw in the PDL Championship game. 2006 saw the beginning of two seasons of dominance for two teams: the Michigan Bucks and the Laredo Heat. Both teams made the PDL Final in 2006 and 2007, with the Bucks emerging victorious in '06 with a 2–1 win thanks to goals by Kenny Uzoigwe and Ty Shipalane, only for Laredo to get their revenge the following year with an epic penalty kicks win after a 0–0 tie in regulation time.

Laredo became the first team to make three consecutive PDL championship games in 2008, but fell at the final hurdle to Thunder Bay Chill, who became the first ever Canadian side to win the PDL following their 4–1 penalty shootout victory. The PDL had grown to 68 teams by 2009, and to reflect their growing reputation, introduced a new scheme called PDL-Pro, whereby certain teams would be allowed to act as professional clubs, paying players, while still adhering to NCAA collegiate eligibility rules, and the USL's own age restriction policy. Ventura County Fusion returned the PDL title to Southern California for the first time in over a decade with a stoppage-time victory over Chicago Fire Premier, and in doing so became the lowest-seeded team to claim the national title.

2010s

The 2010s began with a record, as the Portland Timbers U23s ended the season as national champions, beating Thunder Bay Chill 4–1 in the 2010 PDL Championship game. The Timbers also had the best regular season record, winning all their 16 games, scoring 53 goals and conceding just six along the way. In doing so the Timbers became the first team to post a perfect PDL regular season record since the Jackson Chargers in 1998, the first regular season champion to win the playoffs since the Central Coast Roadrunners in 1996, and the first team in PDL history to go through an entire PDL regular season and playoff campaign without posting a loss or a tie. Portland Timbers U23s striker Brent Richards was named League MVP and Rookie of the Year for his stellar campaign with the national champions. Players from Canadian side Thunder Bay Chill led the majority of the statistical categories, with striker Brandon Swartzendruber leading the league with 15 goals, while his teammate Gustavo Oliveira led the league with 13 assists. Portland Timbers U23s goalkeeper Jake Gleeson enjoyed the best goalkeeping statistics, allowing just five goals in 15 games and earning with a 0.360 GAA average.

Western Conference teams dominated the league in 2011 for the third year in a row, with the Kitsap Pumas ending the season as national champions, beating Laredo Heat 1–0 in the 2011 PDL Championship game. Kitsap, who lost just one game and conceded just ten goals all season, were the second team from the Northwest Division to win the national title in a row, while Laredo were contesting their fourth championship game in six years. Kitsap also were the first PDL-Pro team to win the championship, a milestone for the league. Kitsap's Western Conference rivals Fresno Fuego had the best regular-season record, posting an unbeaten 13–0–3 record. Fresno midfielder Milton Blanco was named League MVP, after leading the league in points (38) and assists (14) and helping his team to the Southwest Division title. Two Michigan Bucks players – Stewart Givens and Mitch Hildebrandt – were given end-of-season awards as Defender of the Year and Goalkeeper of the Year respectively, while their coach Gary Parsons was named Coach of the Year. Jake Keegan of the Westchester Flames was named Rookie of the Year after tallying 16 goals in 16 games to take the league goal-scoring crown. Keegan accounted for 64 percent of Westchester's goals in 2011 and also finished third in the league in points with 34.

The 2012 PDL season would see a resurgence of the Eastern Conference, as the Michigan Bucks would claim the regular season title, with Canadian rivals Forest City London winning their first ever PDL Championship in an East coast contest, defeating Carolina Dynamo 2–1. Canadian clubs would also have another strong season in 2013, with four of eight Canadian clubs finishing in the final eight and two, the Victoria Highlanders and Thunder Bay Chill, advancing to the semi-finals. After a final four finish in 2012, The Chill would repeat their strong season, winning the 2013 regular season title but falling to the Austin Aztex in the Championship final 3–1 in front of a crowd of 4,253 fans, the largest attendance for a final since 2007.

In 2014, the Michigan Bucks would claim their second PDL Championship, defeating the Kitsap Pumas 1–0 on August 3, 2014, following a strong regular season campaign with a record of 9–2–3.

With USL Pro re-branding as the United Soccer League in February 2015, the PDL dropped the "USL" descriptor from their name, simply operating as the "Premier Development League".

The 2015 season would see league newcomers, New York Red Bulls U-23, put forth a very strong showing, finishing first in the Mid Atlantic Division and making it all the way to the Championship Final, before falling to the lower-seeded K-W United FC, who emerged from the very competitive Great Lakes Division, fending off perennial contenders and rivals Forest City London and the defending champions Michigan Bucks on their path to the final. United would come away winners 4–3 over the Red Bulls on August 3, 2015, at Starfire Stadium in Tukwila, Washington to claim their first ever Championship and the third for a Canadian club.

In May 2018, the league did not permit Calgary Foothills FC to sign Stephanie Labbé, a goalkeeper for the Canadian women's team, even though the team had offered her a position. The decision was made due to her gender. Labbé filed a lawsuit against the league.

In 2018, it was announced that the PDL would be renamed as USL League Two in advance of the 2019 season.

2020s
The league was forced to cancel the 2020 season due to the COVID-19 pandemic.

Organization
As USL League Two seasons take place during the summer months, the player pool is drawn mainly from elite college soccer players seeking to continue playing high-level soccer during their summer break, which they can do while still maintaining their college eligibility, as USL2 is not considered a professional league.

Formerly, teams such as Laredo Heat, New Orleans Jesters, Vancouver Whitecaps FC U-23, Kitsap Pumas and the Hollywood United Hitmen had embraced partial professionalism through the PDL-Pro program, whereby teams could choose to employ players who were paid for their performances, but who still met the age eligibility criteria. This did not contravene NCAA rules, which state that college players cannot play alongside professionals, but may play against them. What this also meant, however, is that PDL-Pro teams could not have any active NCAA players on their rosters, but could employ NAIA and community college players, ex-NCAA players who have already graduated, or other local players who do not play college soccer at all.

Currently, all USL2 teams field amateur U-23 squads. Additionally, USL2 squads often also include standout high school and junior club players, as well as former professionals seeking to continue competing at a high level, often having been forced to retire from top flight competition due to age or injury. League rules dictate that a maximum of eight players on each team's 26-man roster can be over 23 years old, while at least three players on each team's roster must be 18 or younger.

Increasingly, League Two is seen as a 'shop window' for professional clubs looking to discover and identify aspiring professional players who may enter the MLS SuperDraft in future years. Many of the players currently playing in Major League Soccer and elsewhere began their careers in the league.

Teams

Current teams 

The following teams are current members of USL League Two.

Champions

Championships
(Defunct teams in italics)

Playoff championships

Regular season championships

USL League Two MVPs

References

Notes

External links
 

 
2
4
Soccer leagues in Canada
Sports leagues established in 1995
1995 establishments in the United States